The Brewery Collectibles Club of America (BCCA) is a 501(c)(3) organization founded in 1970 by Denver Wright Jr. Based in Fenton, Missouri, a suburb of St. Louis, it is dedicated to documenting the history of brewing in the United States and worldwide, and to preserving brewery artifacts. Founded originally as the Beer Can Collectors of America, it was rebranded the Brewery Collectibles Club of America in 2003.

The BCCA has roughly 3000 members worldwide. The BCCA is operated by three Officers and a nine-member Board of Directors. It also consists of committees that manage important club operations.

Many members also belong to multiple BCCA chapters, which operate club-sponsored events in their local jurisdictions. In addition to roughly 60 regional events, the BCCA has held an annual convention, called CANvention, every year since 1971.

History

The Gottfried Krueger Brewing Company of Newark, New Jersey put the first beer cans on the market in Richmond, Virginia on January 24, 1935. Canned beer was an immediate smash, prompting brewers worldwide to install canning lines, or adapt their bottling lines to fill cans. For smaller brewers, that meant "cone top" style cans that could be run through existing bottling lines. For large brewers like Anheuser-Busch, Miller and Pabst, new canning processes were created to fill "flat top" style cans; many early flat top cans had opening instructions printed on the back of the can. Consumers rapidly had a wide variety of canned beers to select from, and hobbyists began accumulating cans from the United States and around the world, at a time when the vast majority of breweries were local or regional (as opposed to latter-day macrobreweries like Anheuser-Busch and Molson Coors).

On October 20, 1969, an article in the St. Louis Globe-Democrat featured the beer can collection of Denver Wright, Jr. The article prompted other St. Louis-area breweriana collectors to contact Wright, and at a meeting at Wright’s house on April 15, 1970, six of these collectors founded the Beer Can Collectors of America. By the end of 1971, the BCCA had 304 members, from 17 states and Canada. The BCCA logo was trademarked in 1977.

BCCA's membership grew steadily through the 1970s, hitting a peak of 11,954 members in 1978. As demand for rarer cans increased, the BCCA's no-sale policy became increasingly anachronistic; the rival (and now-defunct) World Wide Beer Can Collectors organization was started to attract members frustrated by BCCA policies.

Declining membership throughout the 1980s prompted the BCCA to broaden its target audience to include collectors of all breweriana; this led the club to change its name to the current Brewery Collectibles Club of America in 2003. The club also changed its bylaws, allowing chapters to establish their own rules regarding members buying and selling breweriana.

Through its bimonthly magazine and other publications, the BCCA documents the history of brewing in America and worldwide. In 1995, the BCCA authorized the research and publication of the reference guide United States Beer Cans. Volume I, which focused on cans that required an opener (i.e. flat tops and cone tops), was published in 2000, and Volume II, which focused on "self-opening" cans (i.e. pull tabs), was published in 2007.

The BCCA contains an archive of historical beer cans for college reunions. As of 2020, this includes 155 different varieties, including 100 for Princeton University.

Headquarters
The BCCA's Fenton, Missouri headquarters was established in 1977. Typically, one or two of the six annual board meetings occurs here. The BCCA also has paid employees that work remotely in the roles of magazine editor and staff as well as webmaster.

Membership

The BCCA has roughly 3000 members . Peak membership occurred in 1978, with 11,954 active members. and an annual 3-day national CANvention.

All 50 states are represented by multiple active members. In addition, 36 Canadian members representing eight provinces, and 57 members from 17 countries outside North America, maintain active memberships.

Breweriana

BCCA members typically collect breweriana: beer cans, bottles, signs and tap knobs, or anything utilized by a brewery to manufacture or market its products is considered collectible. This includes non-alcoholic items marketed by breweries during Prohibition such as soda and malt beverage containers, malt syrup tins, and ice cream containers. Items that predate Prohibition are highly coveted.

In the BCCA's early years, when collecting was focused almost exclusively on beer cans, members were ranked in five tiers depending on the size of their collections. As the club matured, the focus shifted away from quantity towards valuing the relative rarity, condition, and uniqueness of a given item. Collectors also discovered that the interest in all rare breweriana was growing; many expanded their collections beyond beer cans, which was a key factor spurring the 2003 name change.

Events
The BCCA holds an annual CANvention in August or September, usually in conjunction with Labor Day weekend. All CANventions have been held in the United States with the exception of CANvention 22 in 1992, which was held in Toronto; 27 different states have hosted CANventions, in all regions of the United States.

BCCA sponsors regional shows around the world; these shows are typically smaller and shorter versions of CANvention. Roughly 60 events are held annually.

Chapters
, the BCCA recognizes 92 chapters. Chapters typically consist of members who share a geographic region, such as The Badger Bunch, the first BCCA chapter which was formed by Wisconsin-based members in 1972; there are also 19 "at-large" chapters, for members who share a specific collecting interest or status, regardless of where they reside. There are five BCCA chapters based outside the United States; three are in Canada, and there is one each in Australia and Brazil.

Hall Of Fame
The BCCA established a Hall Of Fame in 1983 to honor members who made exceptional contributions to the club. Every person who was named Collector Of The Year prior to the Hall Of Fame's establishment was inducted as a charter member. Only living members are eligible for election to the BCCA Hall Of Fame. In addition, in 2008, then revised in 2019, the BCCA authorized the Nominating Committee of past presidents to select members not previously selected or deceased members for posthumous induction. , there are 64 honorees.

References

External links

 Brewery Collectibles Club of America

Organizations based in St. Louis
Nonprofit hobbyist organizations based in the United States
Organizations established in 1970
1970 establishments in Missouri